Umm Lekhba is a district in Qatar, located in the municipality of Doha. It was previously known as Al Duhail South, or alternatively, South Duhail.

Etymology
In Arabic, "umm" literally means mother, but in this context is used as a prefix for specific geographic features. The second portion of the name, "lekhba", originates from the Arabic word "khabaa", which is translated as "to hide". This name was given in reference to the fact that the area is relatively discreet since it lies in a depression.

Landmarks

Mercedes-Benz, Nasser Bin Khaled Autombiles on Al Uqouriyat Street.
Hamad Medical Corporation Ambulance Service HQ on Al Markhiya Street.
Tawar Mall on Al Markhiya Street opened in 2018 and covers an area of roughly 90,000 square meters.
Shafallah Centre For Children With Special Needs on Zaid Bin Muhajer Street.

Transport
Major roads that run through the district are Al Markhiya Street, Al Khafji Street, and Al Shamal Road.

Demographics
As of the 2010 census, the district comprised 1,540 housing units and 331 establishments. There were 9,871 people living in the district, of which 51% were male and 49% were female. Out of the 9,871 inhabitants, 68% were 20 years of age or older and 32% were under the age of 20. The literacy rate stood at 97.3%.

Employed persons made up 55% of the total population. Females accounted for 40% of the working population, while males accounted for 60% of the working population.

Education
The following schools are located in Umm Lekhba:

References

Communities in Doha